The following is a list of the television networks and announcers who have broadcast college football's Famous Idaho Potato Bowl throughout the years.

Television

Radio

References

Famous Idaho Potato Bowl
Broadcasters
Famous Idaho Potato Bowl
Famous Idaho Potato Bowl
Famous Idaho Potato Bowl